There has been a significant history of Chinese immigration to Canada, with the first settlement of Chinese people in Canada being in the 1780s. The major periods of Chinese immigration would take place from 1858 to 1923 and 1947 to the present day, reflecting changes in the Canadian government's immigration policy.

Chinese immigrants were originally considered an expendable source of cheap labour due to their economic depression and acceptance of death from Canadian employers. Between 1880 and 1885, the primary work for Chinese labourers in Canada was on the Canadian Pacific Railway (CPR).

Nootka Sound, 1770s 
In 1788, some 120 Chinese contract labourers arrived at Nootka Sound, Vancouver Island. British fur trader John Meares recruited an initial group of 50 sailors and artisans from Canton (Guangzhou) and Macao, China, hoping to build a trading post and encourage trade in sea otter pelts between Nootka Sound and Canton. At Nootka Sound, the Chinese workers built a dockyard, a fort, and a sailing ship, named the North West America. Regarding this journey and the future prospects of Chinese settlement in colonial North America, Meares wrote:

The next year, Meares had another 70 Chinese brought in from Canton. However, shortly after the arrival of this second group, the settlement was seized by the Spanish in what became known as the Nootka Crisis. Seeking to establish a trade monopoly on the West Coast, the Spanish imprisoned the Chinese men. It is unclear what became of them, but likely some returned to China while others were put to work in a nearby mine and later taken to Mexico. No other Chinese people are known to have arrived in western North America until the gold rush of the 1850s.

Gold Rush, 1858 
The Chinese first appeared in large numbers in the Colony of Vancouver Island in 1858 as part of a huge migration from California during the Fraser Canyon Gold Rush in the newly declared Colony of British Columbia. Although the first wave arrived in May from California, news of the gold rush eventually attracted many people from China. As result, Barkerville, British Columbia—located in the Cariboo—became Canada's first Chinese community, where more than half of the town's population was estimated to be Chinese. Several other BC towns also had significant Chinatowns, including Richfield, Stanley, Van Winkle, Quesnellemouthe (modern-day Quesnel), Antler, and Quesnelle Forks.

 In the goldfields, Chinese mining techniques and knowledge turned in to be better than those of other miners. They employed hydraulic techniques, such as the use of 'rockers', and a technique whereby blankets were used to filter alluvial sand and then burned, resulting in the gold melting into lumps in the fire. In the Fraser Canyon, Chinese miners stayed on long after all others had left for the Cariboo Gold Rush or other goldfields elsewhere in BC or the United States. They continued hydraulic mining and farming, and owned the majority of land in the Fraser and Thompson canyons for many years afterward.

There was no shortage of successful Chinese miners: by 1860, the Chinese population of Vancouver Island and British Columbia was estimated to be 7,000. Moreover, Lillooet's Chinatown lasted until the 1930s.

Immigration for the railway, 1871–82 
When British Columbia agreed to join Confederation in 1871, one of its conditions was that the Dominion government build a railway linking BC to Eastern Canada within 10 years. British Columbian politicians and their electorate agitated for a settlement-immigration program for workers from the British Isles to provide this railway labor; however, Prime Minister John A. Macdonald, along with investors and other Canadian politicians, said such would be too expensive.

In opposition, however, the Workingmen's Protective Association was established in 1878 in Victoria with the following purpose:The objects of this society shall be the mutual protection of the working classes of British Columbia against the great influx of Chinese; to use all legitimate means for the suppression of their immigration; to assist each other in the obtaining of employment, and to devise means for the amelioration of the condition of the working classes of the Province in general.Insisting that the project cut costs by employing Chinese workers to build the railway, Prime Minister MacDonald told Parliament in 1882: "It is simply a question of alternatives: either you must have this labour or you can't have the railway."

In 1880, Andrew Onderdonk — an American who was one of the main construction contractors in British Columbia for the Canadian Pacific Railway (CPR) — originally recruited Chinese laborers from California. When most of them deserted the railway workings for the more lucrative goldfields, Onderdonk and his agents signed several agreements with Chinese contractors in China's Guangdong province and Taiwan, as well as via Chinese companies in Victoria.

Chinese-Canadian labor was characterized by low wages (usually receiving less than 50% of what Caucasian workers were paid for the same work) and high levels of volatility. Through Onderdonk's contracts, more than 5,000 laborers were sent as "guest workers" from China by ship, in addition to over 7,000 Chinese railway workers from California whom Onderdonk also recruited. These two groups of workers, who were willing to accept  a day for their labor, were the main force for the building of Onderdonk's 7% of the railway's mileage.

Between 1880 and 1885, 17,000 Chinese laborers completed the British Columbia section of the CPR, with more than 700 perishing due to appalling working conditions. As was the case with non-Chinese workers, some of the laborers fell ill during construction, or died while planting explosives or in other construction accidents.

As with railway workers on other parts of the line in the Prairies and Northern Ontario, most of the Chinese workers lived in canvas tents. These tents were often unsafe and did not provide adequate protection against falling rocks or severe weather in areas of steep terrain. Such tents were typical of working-class accommodations on the frontier for all immigrant workers although (non-Chinese) foremen, shift bosses, and trained railwaymen recruited from the UK were housed in sleeping cars and railway-built houses in Yale and the other railway towns. Chinese railway workers also established transient Chinatowns along the rail line, with housing at the largest consisting of log-houses half dug into the ground, which was a common housing style for natives as well as other frontier settlers, because of the insulating effect of the ground in an area of extreme temperatures.

Largely because of the Trans-Canada railway, Chinese communities developed across the nation, with the vast majority of Chinese Canadians lived in British Columbia during the 1880s.

After completion of the CPR 1885–1947 
From the completion of the CPR to the end of the Exclusion Era (1923–1947), Chinese in Canada lived in mainly a "bachelors of the backpack society" since most Chinese families could not pay the expensive head tax to send their daughters to Canada. Chinese settlers began moving eastward after the completion of the CPR, although Chinese numbers in BC continued to grow.

As with many other groups of immigrants, the Chinese initially found it hard to adjust and assimilate into life in Canada. As a result, they formed ethnic enclaves known as "Chinatowns" where they could live alongside fellow Chinese immigrants, with the vast majority of Chinese Canadians lived in BC during the 1880s. Especially during the 19th century, the white society in British Columbia perceived the Chinese as people who could not be assimilated. In 1885, the Qing Dynasty Consul General Huang Zunxian told a Royal Commission on Chinese Immigration:[I]t is charged that the Chinese do not emigrate to foreign countries to remain, but only to earn a sum of money and return to their homes in China. It is only about thirty years since our people commenced emigrating to other lands. A large number have gone to the Straits' Settlements, Manila, Cochin China, and the West India Islands, and are permanently settled there with their families. In Cuba, fully seventy-five percent have married native women and adopted those Islands as their future homes. Many of those living in the Sandwich Islands have done the same... You must recollect that the Chinese immigrant coming to this country is denied all the rights and privileges extended to others in the way of citizenship; the laws compel them to remain aliens. I know a great many Chinese will be glad to remain here permanently with their families if they are allowed to be naturalized and can enjoy privileges and rights.By 1886, the population of Victoria Chinatown had increased tenfold from the completion of the CPR to over 17,000; and at the turn of the 20th century, there were 17,312 Chinese settlers in Canada. By the 1940s, almost 50% of the Chinese-Canadian population lived on the West Coast. Until the 1960s, there were no significant populations of Chinese in any other province.

Immigration Acts and Exclusion Era, 1885–1947 
In 1885, the Government of Canada passed the Chinese Immigration Act, 1885, levying a 'Head Tax' of $50 on any Chinese coming to Canada, thereby making Chinese people the only ethnic group to pay a tax in order to enter Canada. What's more is that, well before the 1885 Act, a series of Chinese tax acts were passed in British Columbia. After the 1885 legislation failed to deter Chinese immigration, the Canadian government passed the Chinese Immigration Act, 1900 to increase the tax to $100. The Chinese had no choice but to pay it even though it was worth two years' salary of a railway worker.

Chinese Consolidated Benevolent Association, 1885 
Soon afterward, Chinese merchants among larger Chinese communities formed the Chinese Consolidated Benevolent Association (CCBA), which was registered as a charitable organization in August 1884, but effectively served as an "internal administrative institution" in the Chinese-Canadian community. The CCBA opened their first branch in Victoria in 1885 and a second in Vancouver in 1895. The Association was mandatory for all Chinese in the area to join and would do everything from representing members in legal disputes to sending the remains of members who died back to their ancestral homelands in China. 

Huang Zunxian, the Chinese Consulate in San-Francisco, played an integral role in the establishment of CCBA:Now the Honorable Huang Zun Xian permitted to forward our case to the Chinese Ambassador to England to send again an official protest to the British Government. He also instructed that we raise funds, firstly, to hire lawyers for the case, and secondly, to be prepared for the establishment of The Chinese Consolidated Benevolent Association. This Chinese representative body could, therefore, address all the issues concerning the Westerners, and do benevolence by taking care of the sick and the poor Chinese.With the large extent of discriminatory legislation against Chinese immigrants, CCBA worked actively in seeking external support, for instance, by sending letters to the Chinese Ambassador to England and the Chinese Foreign Minister, as well as corresponding with the Chinese Consul in San-Francisco. CCBA would also send petitions to local administrations. In 1909, in response to the City of Victoria's policy of segregating Chinese children in public schools, CCBA constructed the Chinese Public School.

In addition, during the early 20th century, fraternal-political associations such as the Guomindang and the Freemasons were involved in Chinatown politics and community issues, adjudicating disputes within the community and speaking for the community to the non-Chinese world. After legislation in 1896 that stripped Chinese of voting rights in municipal elections in BC, Chinese people in BC became completely disenfranchised. The elector's list in federal elections came from the provincial elector's list, and the provincial ones came from the municipal one.

Royal Commission and Chinese professions, 1902–07 
In 1902, the federal government appointed a Royal Commission on Chinese and Japanese Immigration, which concluded that "the Chinese are more unhealthy as a class than the same class of white people," and that they were "unfit for full citizenship...obnoxious to a free community and dangerous to the state." Through the Chinese Immigration Act, 1903, the Government would further increase the landing fees to $500 (equivalent to CA$10,336.27 in 2021) following demand by B.C. politicians. Following the 1903 legislation of $500, the number of Chinese who paid the fee in the first fiscal year dropped from 4,719 to 8.

In addition to federal legislation, municipal ordinances restricted employment opportunities. In BC, Chinese professionals were prohibited from practicing such professions as law, pharmacy, and accountancy. During the next 40 years after 1885, following the completion of the CPR, Chinese persons became involved in the labor behind an industrializing economy. With legislation banning Chinese from many professions, Chinese entered those that non-Chinese Canadians did not want to do, such as laundry shops or salmon processing. Skilled or semi-skilled, Chinese Canadians labored in British Columbia sawmills and canneries; others became market gardeners or grocers, pedlars, shopkeepers, and restaurateurs. A "credit-ticket" system evolved in this time whereby Chinese lenders in China or North America would agree to pay the travel expenses of a migrant who was then bound to the lender until the debt was repaid, despite the fact that such contracts would not be legally enforceable in Canada. Chinese workers opened grocery stores and restaurants that served the whole population, including non-Chinese, and Chinese cooks became the mainstay in the restaurant and hotel industries as well as in private service. Chinese success at market gardening led to a continuing prominent role in the produce industry in British Columbia. Ethnic discrimination was rampant during these times, as evidenced by large-scale Anti-Asian Riots in Vancouver in 1907.

Exclusion Act, 1923 
The Chinese Immigration Act, 1923, better known as the "Chinese Exclusion Act", replaced prohibitive fees with an outright ban on Chinese immigration to Canada with the exceptions of merchants, diplomats, students, and "special circumstances" cases. (Ethnic Chinese people with British nationality were also restricted from entering Canada.) The Chinese who entered Canada prior to 1924 had to register with the local authorities and could leave Canada only for two years or less.

Just before the enactment of the Exclusion Act, the Chinese Association of Canada went to Ottawa to lobby against the bill. Since the Act went into effect on 1 July 1923, Chinese people at the time referred to Dominion Day as "' Humiliation Day" and refused to celebrate Dominion Day until after the act was repealed in 1947. Vancouver's Chinatown during the exclusion era became a thriving economic and social destination that was home to many Chinese Canadians on the West Coast.

The discriminatory laws also gave way to a gender imbalance among Chinese immigrants. Primarily due to the head tax, the cost of bringing a dependent, such as a wife or aged parents, to Canada became prohibitive. As such, Chinese men typically came alone, living as bachelors in Canada. In 1886, there were only 119 females among a total population of 1680; in 1931, only 3,648 were women among a total Chinese population of 46,519. A survey was done in 1922 by Republican China's Overseas Chinese Bureau showed that, among Victoria Chinatown's whole population of 3,681, only 456 were females. In the late 1920s, it was estimated that there were only five married Chinese women in Calgary and six in Edmonton.

Post-war period, 1947–99 
With the Chinese Immigration Act, 1923 being repealed in 1947, the majority of immigrants in Canada emigrated from the People's Republic of China, including Hong Kong, and the Republic of China (Taiwan). Other Chinese immigrants have come from South Asia, Southeast Asia, South Africa, the Caribbean, and South America. From 1947 to the early 1970s, Chinese immigrants to Canada came mostly from Hong Kong, Taiwan, or Southeast Asia. Chinese-Canadians gained the vote federally and provincially in 1947. Chinese immigration, still, was limited only to the spouse of a Chinese man who had Canadian citizenship and his dependents.

After the founding of the People's Republic of China (PRC) in October 1949 and its support for the communist North in the Korean War, Chinese in Canada faced another wave of resentment, as Chinese were viewed as communist agents from the PRC. Moreover, those from mainland China who were eligible in the family reunification program had to visit the Canadian High Commission in Hong Kong, as Canada and the PRC did not have diplomatic relations until 1970.

Chinese Adjustment Statement Program and other policies, 1960–73 
In 1959, the Department of Citizenship and Immigration discovered a problem with immigration papers used by Chinese immigrants to enter Canada, and the Royal Canadian Mounted Police were brought in to investigate. Evidently, some Chinese had been entering Canada by purchasing real or fake birth certificates of Chinese-Canadian children bought and sold in Hong Kong. These children carrying false identity papers were referred to as paper sons. In response, Minister of Citizenship and Immigration Ellen Fairclough announced the "Chinese Adjustment Statement Program" on 9 June 1960, which granted amnesty for paper sons or daughters if they confessed to the government. As a result, about 12,000 paper sons came forward, until the amnesty period ended in October 1973.

Independent Chinese immigration in Canada came after Canada eliminated race and the "place of origin" section from its immigration policy in 1967. Four years later, in 1971, an official policy of multiculturalism was implemented in efforts to tackle institutional racism.

Many Chinese also enlisted in the Canadian forces, despite Ottawa and the BC government being unwilling to send Chinese-Canadian recruits into action, since they did not want Chinese to ask for enfranchisement after the war. However, with 90,000 British troops captured in the Battles of Malaya and Singapore in February 1942, Ottawa decided to send Chinese-Canadian forces in as spies to train the local guerrillas to resist the Japanese Imperial Forces in 1944. These spies were nevertheless little more than a token gesture, as the outcome of World War II had been more or less decided by that time.

Late 1970s 
A turning point for Chinese in Canada was an incident in September 1979 involving a W5 feature report, which stated that foreign Chinese were taking away opportunities from Canadian citizens for university educations. In response, Chinese communities nationwide united to fight anti-Chinese sentiments.

The report, suggesting that there were 100,000 foreign students, featured a girl complaining that her high marks had not allowed her into the University of Toronto's pharmacy program because seats had been taken up by foreign students.

The data used in the report, however, proved inaccurate. The Canadian Bureau for International Education revealed that there were only 55,000 foreign students in Canada at all levels of education, and only 20,000 full-time foreign university students. Historian Anthony B. Chan devoted an entire chapter of his 1983 book Gold Mountain to the incident, and found that, contrary to the claims of the prospective pharmacy student, there were no foreign students in Toronto's program that year. Chan emphasized the anger that the Chinese-Canadian community had about the images of anonymous Chinese people in the feature was because they felt the "implication was that all students of Chinese origin were foreigners, and that Canadian taxpayers were subsidizing Chinese students—regardless of citizenship."

Chinese communities nationwide staged protests against CTV Television, the network that airs W5. Initially, CTV would only offer a "statement of regret" but the protests continued until an apology was made in 1980. Network executive Murray Chercover acknowledged the inaccuracy of a great deal of the program's information, adding that the network "sincerely apologize[s] for the fact Chinese-Canadians were depicted as foreigners, and for whatever distress this stereotyping may have caused them in the context of our multicultural society." The protesters met in Toronto in 1980 and agreed to form the Chinese Canadian National Council (CCNC) to better represent Chinese Canadians on a national level.

1980s–90s 
The 1980s saw movement of Chinese in Canada from the ethnic enclaves of Chinatowns to outlying suburbs of major Canadian cities. This movement was seen by some as changing the fabric of some communities with the establishment of new ethnic enclaves, commercial areas, and use of Chinese-language signage. Carole Bell, Deputy Mayor of Markham, Ontario, expressed that the overwhelming Chinese presence in the city was causing other residents to move out of Markham. Additionally during the 1980s, local communities in Toronto and Vancouver have accused the Chinese immigrants for hyperinflating property prices.

During the mid-1980s and early 1990s, Canada's recession and growth of the Chinese economy resulted in a shift in Chinese migration in Canada. Attracted by the employment opportunities back home, some newer immigrants moved back, with many retaining their Canadian citizenship. This resulted in the phenomenon of astronaut families, whereby the husband, being the money-earner, would only visit Canada once or twice a year, usually during December or the summer months, but the rest of his family would live in Canada.

The Chinese community also sought redress for past injustices done against them. Since the early 1980s, there has been a campaign to redress the Head Tax paid by Chinese entering Canada from 1885 to 1923, led by the CCNC. However, the movement did not gather enough support to be noticed by the government until the 1990s. Still, the government was largely resistant to the calls of apologizing and refunding the head tax to the payers or their descendants. Canadian courts also ruled that while the government had no legal obligation to redress the head tax, it had a moral obligation to do so. The Liberal governments of the 1990s adopted the position of "no apology, no compensation" as the basis of negotiating with the Chinese groups and were criticized for stonewalling the Chinese community.

Immigrants from Hong Kong, late 1990s 
With the political uncertainties as Hong Kong headed towards 1997, many residents of Hong Kong chose to immigrate to Canada, as it was relatively easier for them to enter the country due to their Commonwealth of Nations connections. It was also relatively easier for Hong Kongers to migrate to Canada than to the US, as the latter set fixed quotas for different nationalities, while Canada ran on a "points" system, allowing immigrants to arrive if they have desirable factors such as graduate degrees, training, funds to start new businesses and language abilities.

According to statistics compiled by the Canadian Consulate in Hong Kong, from 1991 to 1996, "about 30,000 Hong Kongers emigrated annually to Canada, comprising over half of all Hong Kong emigration and about 20% of the total number of immigrants to Canada." The great majority of these people settled in the Toronto and Vancouver areas, as there are well-established Chinese communities in those cities. After the Handover, there was a sharp decline in immigration numbers, possibly indicating a smooth transition towards political stability. In the years to come, the unemployment and underemployment of many Hong Kong immigrants in Canada prompted a stream of returning migrants.

Immigration in the 21st century

Today, Mainland China has taken over from Hong Kong as the largest source of Chinese immigration. A great number of immigrants have been Cantonese speakers, and a disproportionate representation of Cantonese over other Chinese immigrants is prevalent in many Chinese communities in Canada. The Peoples Republic of China (PRC) has also taken over from all countries and regions as the country sending the most immigrants to Canada.

According to statistics from Citizenship and Immigration Canada (CIC), between 1999 and 2009 the largest number of immigrants to Canada came from the PRC. CIC statistics for 2002 showed that the Canadian immigrants from the PRC averaged well over 30,000 immigrants per year, totaling an average of 15% of all immigrants to Canada. This trend showed no sign of slowing down, with an all-time high of 42,295 reached in 2005. By 2010, 36,580 immigrants from the Philippines surpassed the 30,195 from the PRC. Filipinos retained their status as the number one immigrant group to Canada in 2011 with 34,991. The PRC lagged behind with 28,696.

Chinese-Canadians have become more involved in politics, both provincially and federally. Douglas Jung (1957–1962) not only became the first Canadian Member of Parliament (MP) of Chinese and Asian descent in the House of Commons, but also the first member of a visible minority elected to the Parliament of Canada. In 1993, Raymond Chan became the first ethnic Chinese to be appointed into the cabinet, after winning the riding of Richmond in the 1993 federal election. Many Chinese-Canadians have run for office in subsequent federal elections:

 after two failed attempts, New Democratic Party candidate Olivia Chow (wife of NDP leader Jack Layton) was elected in the 2006 federal election, representing the riding of Trinity—Spadina;
 Alan Lowe became the first Chinese-Canadian Mayor of Victoria BC (1999–2008);
 Ida Chong was a Saanich municipal councilor in the Victoria BC region before being elected in 2001 as a BC provincial cabinet minister in Liberal Premier Gordon Campbell's administration;
 the Bloc Québécois had an ethnic-Chinese candidate, May Chiu, running in the riding of LaSalle—Émard against Liberal Party leader Paul Martin during the 2006 election;
 Philip Lee became the first Asian Lieutenant-Governor in Manitoba;
 Norman Kwong, Canada's first professional Chinese-Canadian football player, also became Alberta's first Chinese Lieutenant-Governor.

Because of the influx of Chinese emigrants from the global diaspora, community organizations reflecting Chinese people from Cuba, India, Jamaica, Mauritius, Peru, and so on, have established a considerable presence in Canada. Immigrants from the PRC have organized into many associations. The Chinese Professionals Association of Canada (CPAC) reported having a membership of over 30,000 in 2019. In terms of education, the Chinese Canadian Historical Society of British Columbia was created in 2004 to educate the general public about Chinese people in Canada; the University of Toronto's Richard Charles Lee Canada-Hong Kong Library is a dedicated resource centre for Chinese-Canadian studies; the Toronto-based Chinese Culture and Education Society of Canada teaches Chinese and aims to develop education and cultural exchanges between Canada and China.

Apology and redress, 2004–06 

During the 2004 federal election campaign, NDP leader Jack Layton pledged to issue an apology and compensation for the Exclusion-Era head tax. After the 2006 election, the newly elected Conservative Party indicated in its Throne Speech that it would provide a formal apology and appropriate redress to families affected by racist policies of the past. It concluded a series of National Consultations across Canada in 2006, from 21–30 April, in Halifax, Vancouver, Toronto, Edmonton, Montreal, and Winnipeg.

The Liberal Party, which lost the 2006 election (as the outgoing government) changed their positions and were accused of "flip-flopping" on the issue during the election campaign as well as being questioned about their sincerity. Many Chinese, particularly the surviving head-tax payers and their descendants criticized Raymond Chan, the Chinese-Canadian cabinet minister who was left in charge of settling the matter, for compromising the Chinese community in favour of the government and misleading the public.

On 22 June 2006, Prime Minister Stephen Harper delivered a message of redress in the House of Commons, offering an apology in Cantonese and compensation for the head tax once paid by Chinese immigrants. Although their children will not be offered this payment, Chinese Canadian leaders like Joseph Wong regarded it as an important and significant move in Chinese Canadian history. There were about 20 people who paid the tax still alive in 2006.

Contemporary Chinese-Canadian community 

In contemporary Canada, Chinese Canadian immigrants tend to be treated as if they belong to a single cultural or ethnic community with common interests and common spokesmen.  Nothing could be further from the truth.  China, like India, is not one homogeneous nation, rather it is a federation of as many nations as make up Western Europe, each with populations in the hundreds of millions and traditionally speaking distinctive languages which, while often mutually unintelligible in speech, are mutually intelligible when written, thanks to a unique innovation made by an early Qin emperor.  In the interests of nation building, the current government is hastening the demise of these languages in favour of the Beijing dialect of Mandarin.  Members of each of these different nations emigrated at different times, and in numbers completely disproportionate to their relative numbers in China.  So from an ethno-cultural point of view, treating all of these groups as one, called Chinese-Canadians, who somehow reflect the makeup of modern China, is analogous to treating Canadians of French, Spanish, Latin American, Portuguese and Italian heritage, as one group that reflect modern Europe.  One hears the term "Han Chinese" used as a racial indicator of "true" Chinese vs Mongolian, Manchurian, Tibetan, or other subgroups of people who have inhabited or even ruled large parts of China historically.  That term could be interpreted as being analogous to "Western European" when used to describe the racial groups that make up Eurasia.

The imperative to emigrate from China was different for different groups at different times, so the composition of the Canadian population of Chinese descent bears analyzing from the perspective of when they came to Canada.  This will also explain how and how much Chinese Canadians as a group differ from Chinese in China.

The initial migrations (1850 - 1923) were from the poorest classes of China who were willing to accept the risk, pay the Head Tax, and put in the hard work in search of economic survival and then prosperity.  In the Nineteenth Century, the poorest migratory groups lived in the farthest south of China, hence formed the emigrating classes.  Those from Fujian province and south coast groups such as the Hakka migrated primarily south west to Southeast Asia, Thailand, Singapore, Malaysia and Vietnam (more about them later), and even across the Indian Ocean to South Africa through British Empire connections.  The group that colonized North America, both Canada and the US, during the Gold Rushes and railroad building years, were largely from rural villages in the hilly counties (the "Four Counties", Sze Yap in Wade–Giles Cantonese, Xi Yi in Pinyin Mandarin) to the west of Guangzhou (Canton), who were speakers of a sister language of Cantonese called Toi-san (Tai Shan in Pinyin).  This group came to North America largely with the intent of sending money home to amass enough for a comfortable retirement, since they were quickly denied political, familial migratory, educational and economic rights in Canada. With the passage of the restrictive travel and family unification laws, the society in Canada was overwhelmingly a bachelor one interspersed with 2 year long conjugal visits if affluent enough.  The relatively few women and families were still enough to establish small communities of Canadian born Chinese, and their descendants can claim up to five and six generations of being Canadian born.  Toisan-ese was the primary spoken language of North American Chinatowns until well after the Second World War (1960's).  One curiosity of this group is that Canadian immigration officials of the Victorian era did not realize that Chinese three syllable names start with the surname, with a generational name in the middle, and the given name at the end.  So official English names were often registered backwards (eg) Wong Wai Kwong, who in Canada is known as Mr. W. W. Kwong, but in China is Mr. Wong, and belongs to the Wong family association.  As well, names that were Anglicized in this era used the Wade–Giles phonetic system, with the result of names spelled Lee, Wong and Chan, instead of the Pinyin system adopted by the People's Republic of China which would Anglicize those same names as Li, Huang and Jian.

After 1947 and the loosening of restrictions to Chinese immigration, family reunification commenced and continued for the next four decades. But because of place-of-origin restrictions, immigration from China would remain limited until the immigration policy change of 1967.  While the US saw the influx of Mandarin speaking Nationalist Chinese allies after the Communist victory in China in 1949, Chinese Canadians remained overwhelmingly of Toisanese descent. A few politically connected Mandarin speakers, as well as Shanghainese speakers from the business capital of China, and Cantonese speakers from the British colony of Hong Kong, came to Canada in those years, but not in as great numbers. In Canadian immigration statistics, all would be listed as simply Chinese.

In the 1960s, China rationed water to Hong Kong as it flexed its muscles to remind the UK that the lease would be up in 1997, precipitating the next chapter in Chinese immigration to Canada, but this time by urban Cantonese speakers from Hong Kong.  This group was generally well educated, entrepreneurial, and more affluent, compared to the uneducated hard working labourers of a century earlier. Old downtown Toisanese Chinatowns were superseded by new suburban Cantonese speaking ones, and the affluence of the Cantonese migrants was felt in business and property development.  Over a decade or two, Cantonese speakers became more numerous than Toisanese speakers, most of whose descendants had become English speakers.  This was also the era of "astronaut" families, where wives and/or children were settled in Canada but businessmen stayed in Hong Kong due to more favourable business and tax laws.  During the latter years of the 20th century, Cantonese speakers, despite being 5% of Chinese in China, constituted the majority of Chinese Canadians.

People of Chinese descent also immigrated to Canada after having spent many years or generations in many other countries.  For example, in 1979 and 1980, ethnic Chinese who had immigrated to Vietnam over preceding centuries were forced to flee Vietnam and tens of thousands arrived in Canada during those years as refugees known as the "boat people", not to be confused with ethnic Vietnamese refugees who came earlier after the end of the Vietnam War. During the Apartheid Era in South Africa, South Africans of Chinese descent came to Canada.  Surnames from this group can sometimes be identified because the immigration officials in South Africa in bygone days registered their Anglicized names using two or all three of the Chinese names, resulting in polysyllabic surnames.

See also 

 Chinese head tax in Canada
 Chinese Immigration Act, 1923
 Immigration to Canada
Chinese Canadians in British Columbia
 Chinese Canadians in Ontario
Asiatic Exclusion League
Lost Years: A People's Struggle for Justice

References

Further reading

 Anthony B. Chan. The Chinese in the New World Vancouver, BC: New Star, 1983.
 Stephanie D. Bangarth. "'We are not asking you to open the gates for Chinese immigration': The Committee for the Repeal of the Chinese Immigration Act and Early Human Rights Activism in Canada." Canadian Historical Review 84, 3 (September 2003): 395–442.
 Historica Canada. "Nitro." Heritage Minutes.
Hoong, Ng Weng. 2013 November 27. "New B.C. book unearths Chinese labourers' secret role in First World War." The Georgia Straight.
Peter S. Li. Chinese in Canada (Second Edition). Toronto, ON: Oxford University Press, 1998.
 Peter S. Li. "Chinese." Encyclopedia of Canada's Peoples. Toronto: Multicultural History Society of Ontario, 1999.
 Janet Lum. "Recognition and the Toronto Chinese Community" in Reluctant Adversaries: Canada and the People's Republic of China, 1949-1970. Edited by Paul M. Evans and B. Michael Frolic, 217–239. Toronto, ON: University of Toronto Press, 1991. (It is a discussion on the Toronto Chinese's view on Canada recognizing the PRC in 1969–1970).
 James Morton.  In the Sea of Sterile Mountains: The Chinese in British Columbia.  Vancouver, BC: J.J. Douglas, 1974.  (A thorough discussion of Chinese immigration and life in BC, railway politics and a detailed profile of the political agendas and personalities of the time)
 Patricia Roy.  "A white man's province : British Columbia politicians and Chinese and Japanese immigrants, 1858-1914" Vancouver : UBC Press, 1989.
 Patricia Roy. "The Oriental question : Consolidating a white man's province, 1914-41"  Vancouver : UBC Press, 2003.
 Lloyd Sciban. Important Events in the History of the Chinese in Canada.
 Wing Chung Ng. "The Chinese in Vancouver, 1945-80: The Pursuit of Identity and Power." Vancouver: UBC Press, 1999.
British Columbia from the earliest times to the present, Vol 2, Chapter XXXII - Chinese and Japanese Immigration, E.O.S. Scholefield & Frederic William Howay, S.J. Clarke Pub. Co., Vancouver, British Columbia, 1914
"Victoria Chinese Canadian Veterans Association: Veteran fighters for Canada and Chinese Canadian Citizenship." Victoria Chinatown.

External links
 Lost Years
 Chinese Canadian Redress
 Chinese Canadian National Council
Historica's Heritage Minute video docudrama "Nitro." (Adobe Flash Player)

Library resources
 Chinese Canadian Genealogy at the Vancouver Public Library
 Chinese-Canadians: Profiles from a Community - Vancouver Public Library wiki
 Chinese Immigration in BC - An archival collection from the UBC Library Digital Collections documenting Chinese settlement in British Columbia
 Historic Chinese Language Materials in British Columbia, Asian Library and the Centre for Chinese Research, University of British Columbia, Vancouver
 Multicultural Canada website - includes eight full-text searchable Chinese newspapers from B.C. and Ontario, publications relating to immigration, photographs, and the records of Victoria's Chinese Benevolent Association and the Cheekungtong (Chinese Freemasons) of Victoria and Vancouver
 The Early Chinese Canadians 1858-1947, Library and Archives Canada

History of Chinese Canadians
History of immigration to Canada
Political history of Canada
Chinese emigration